The Murchison Building is an eleven-story brick and marble building in Wilmington, North Carolina, USA. It occupies the corner of Front and Chestnut Street. Sitting on historic waterfront property, the building overlooks the Cotton Exchange and Cape Fear Community College to the north, USS North Carolina Battleship Memorial and Cape Fear to the west, Riverfront Park and Chandlers Wharf to the south and Wilmington Downtown including its Courthouse to the east.

History 
The Murchison Building, at the corner of Front and Chestnut Streets, has been a staple of the waterfront skyline for nearly a century. "The Murch" was built for and by the Murchison National Bank, and until 1972 was called the Murchison National Bank Building. Another building, the original four-story Murchison National Bank built in 1902, is directly across the street.

In its infancy, the Murchison was considered top-of-the-line. It was heated by two boilers, sending steam heat to radiators throughout the building. It had an onsite artesian well, supplying its own water. Female employees and patrons had a women's restroom on the fourth floor. The second and third floors were provided with gas and electric appliances so that those occupants (mostly doctors and dentists) would have the most modern surgical equipment available.

A claim to fame of the 1914 Murchison Building was that it had human elevator operators. One operator "survived" the 1983 renovations intact, and remains as the lift's operator. She is the building's longest tenant, with 16 years tenure. Another quaint feature was a woman's bathroom on the fourth floor, touted as a selling point for the building.

In 1921 a hospital was built next door.

Construction 

Construction began on the site in August 1913. The previous structure was owned by the 'Cape Fear Club for Men' according to a bronze plaque fixed to the building's front.

It was built in 1914 as The Murchison National Bank, WILMINGTON, N. C. The waterproofing was by Impervious Products Co. The terra cotta was by South Amboy Terra Cotta Co. The cement floors and walks were by Harrison & Meyer. The Kentucky Blue Stone was supplied by the Rowan County Freestone Co.

It was designed by Wilmington native Kenneth M. Murchison of New York.

Architecture 

The Murchison still juts into the sky above the downtown skyline nearly a century since its inception. It is second only to the PPD building in heights of buildings in Wilmington. A plaque on the front of the building denotes that the building's architecture is of the Classical Revival style. A number of US skyscrapers built in the 1910s and 1920s have startlingly similar looks to the Murchison.

Features of neoclassical revival architecture 

Neoclassical (or neoclassical revival) buildings have traits such as classical symmetry, full-height porch with columns and temple-like fronts. Ornamentation that iconifies this style are classics, such as dentil cornices.

Historic waterfront neighborhood 

The Murchison is near the northern terminus of Wilmington's Riverwalk, a historic waterfront pedestrian stroll among buildings and businesses that front the Cape Fear River. This inland port thrived from the cotton trade during the late 19th century and early 20th century and is now home to restaurants, theaters, nightclubs and weekly free concerts during the summer months.

Riverfront district 
Wilmington's downtown riverfront district contains restaurants, cafes, historic buildings, art galleries, antique shops, pubs, nightclubs, music clubs. It has several pedestrian-friendly environments. Wilmington's Nationally Preserved Historic District is anchored by nautical, civic, wartime, and other landmarks.

World War II battleship 
The Murchison Building enjoys a commanding view of Battleship Park and the floating museum USS North Carolina located across the Cape Fear River. The ship is viewable in aerial photography of the area, e.g. Google Earth and can serve as a landmark when pinpointing the building from them.

The USS-North Carolina was towed and placed in her permanent berth on October 2, 1961 and is a National Historic Landmark.

Occupancy 
Early business occupancy would have characterized the Murchison Building as prestigious: banks, dentists, doctors, and the city's newspaper have called this building home. Business occupants now include The Upper Room Barbershop (http://theupperoombarbershop.com) on the 5th floor, Atlantic Shopper, the headquarters for state and national-level politicians, a legal-aid agency, a radio station, web and logo design services, engineers and architects. Brian Ballard, owner of Pour Taproom, will be leasing the space and be opening the self serve taproom in early April

Significant commercial occupants (past) 
 Wilmington Star-News ground floor 1935-1970 
 First Union National Bank
 Wilmington Chamber of Commerce 1914-1924
 The Edge 88.5 FM Radio Station

Significant commercial occupants (present) 
Atlantic Shopper 
 e-Interchange, Internet Marketing
 BlueTone Media: 2005–Present 
 US Senator Richard Burr (R)
 Northern Trust
 Legal Aid of NC
 Shuckin' Shack Franchising, LLC
 Viewpoint Screening

References 

Buildings and structures in Wilmington, North Carolina
Skyscraper office buildings in North Carolina
Skyscrapers in North Carolina
Office buildings completed in 1914